is a Japanese politician of the Liberal Democratic Party, a member of the House of Councillors in the Diet (national legislature). A graduate of Senshu University, he was elected to the House of Councillors for the first time in 2004.

References

External links 
 Official website in Japanese.

Members of the House of Councillors (Japan)
1964 births
Living people
Liberal Democratic Party (Japan) politicians